Corben Sharrah (born April 20, 1992) is an American male BMX rider, representing his nation at international competitions. He competed in the time trial event at the 2015 UCI BMX World Championships.

He has qualified to represent the United States at the 2020 Summer Olympics.

References

External links
 
 
 
 
 

1992 births
Living people
BMX riders
American male cyclists
Olympic cyclists of the United States
Cyclists at the 2016 Summer Olympics
Cyclists at the 2020 Summer Olympics
Sportspeople from Tucson, Arizona